Il giorno del furore (UK title: Fury, also released as One Russian Summer) is a 1973 Italian film based on Lermontov's juvenile novel. It stars  Oliver Reed and Claudia Cardinale.

Plot

Palizyn is the patriarch of an aristocratic family in pre-revolutionary Russia. Ruthless and savage, he exercises great power over his dependents, his peers, and his army of servants. Vadim, outwardly the most wretched and obedient of the servants, secretly arranges for them to revolt.

Cast
Oliver Reed: Palizyn
John McEnery: Vadim
Carole André: Irene
Ray Lovelock: Yuri
Claudia Cardinale:	Anya

References

External links

1973 films
1970s Italian-language films
Films based on Russian novels
Films set in Russia
Films set in the 18th century
Italian historical films
1970s historical films
English-language Italian films
1970s English-language films
1970s Italian films